Major General Muhammad Nawaz  was a general officer of the Pakistan Army. For his meritorious and excellent service he was awarded the Hilal-e-Imtiaz (Military) and Sitara-e-Basalat by the Government of Pakistan.

Early life
Muhammad Nawaz was born in Chiniot, Jhang District, into an Arain Family. Nawaz stayed in Chiniot during his childhood and initial years of education.

Personal life
He was married and is survived by two daughters and one son (one was martyred with him in the helicopter crash).

Military career
Nawaz was accepted into the Pakistan Military Academy (PMA) in 1978 into the 61st PMA Long Course. After successfully completing his military training, he was commissioned into the Pakistan Army on 27March 1980 and was inducted into the 14 Frontier Force Regiment. He obtained his BSc in War Studies from the Command and Staff College and his MSc degree in War Studies from the National Defence University, Islamabad.

As well as active service with his own unit Regiment 14 FF, he served as DG Rangers (Punjab), Commander 31st Independent Infantry Brigade, Commander 40th Infantry Division Okara, Instructor at Command & Staff College Quetta and School of Armour & Mechanized Warfare, Deputy Director General ISI, Defense & Army Attaché at PAK Embassy in Tehran, and Staff Officer at the  Headquarters of the Ministry of Defense of Saudi Arabia

He was promoted to the rank of Major general on 8August 2008. After this promotion he was posted as a general officer commanding the 40th Infantry Division, Okara, and later on as director general of the Punjab Rangers.

Death
While he was on duty traveling to meet with troops of the Pakistan Rangers, the helicopter he was in crashed in the Indus River due to bad weather. Nawaz, along with the rest of the crew, died on impact.

Among the crew was his son Capt Asif Nawaz, Pilot Lieutenant Colonel Syed Amir Abbas, and Airman/Technician Subedar Abadullah. Nawaz was buried with his son in his home town, Chak 126 JB in Chiniot, with full military honours.

References

1957 births
2011 deaths
Recipients of Hilal-i-Imtiaz
Frontier Force Regiment officers
Pakistani generals
Pakistani military personnel killed in action
Pakistan Army officers
Punjabi people